Keel depth (sometimes given as Depth to keel) is the depth (or draft) of water from the water surface to the keel of a vessel, the deepest part.  The keel establishes a commonly defined reference point to measure to.

Keel depth is useful for determining safe operating depth in shallow water.

References 
 A WW II submarine depth gauge displaying "Depth to keel"

Nautical terminology
Ship measurements